"" ("Christ our Lord came to the Jordan") is a Lutheran hymn about baptism by Martin Luther, written in 1541 and published in 1543. It has been set in many musical compositions, including cantatas and chorale preludes by Johann Sebastian Bach.

History of the hymn text
Luther wrote the hymn focused on baptism as part of his teaching about Lutheran concepts, possibly as the last hymn he wrote. Luther held sermons about baptism in the Easter week of 1540; it seems likely that he wrote the hymn in that context. It is closely connected to Luther's teaching about baptism in his Small Catechism, reflecting the structure of his questions and answers.

Several later publications refer to the year 1541 as a first publication as a broadsheet, which did not survive. The hymn appeared in 1543, summarized "A Spiritual Song of our Holy Baptism, which is a fine summary of What it is? Who established it? What are its benefits?" (""). In the Lutheran liturgy, the hymn was related to the feast day of John the Baptist. In the current Protestant hymnal, it appears as EG 202.

Melody
The hymn tune, Zahn No. 7246, in the Dorian mode, is older than the text and appeared already in 1524 in Johann Walter's choral hymnal  with the hymn "" (a paraphrase of Psalm 67). 
When Luther looked for a melody for the new baptism hymn, "" was already assigned a different melody. It made sense to use a tune for a hymn about God's grace for a specific expression of that grace in baptism. Walter revised the four-part setting from 1524 with the melody in the tenor, adapting it to the different text. It was published in 1550.

Below is the melody first published in 1524:

Text 

Below is the text of Luther's hymn with the English translation by George Macdonald.

Use in musical compositions 

The hymn has been set in many choral and organ compositions. A four-part setting by Wolf Heintz was used to introduce the Reformation in Halle in 1541. Choral settings include works by Hans Leo Hassler, Johann Hermann Schein and Samuel Scheidt; while organ settings include a Ricercar by Michael Praetorius and chorale preludes by Hieronymus Praetorius, Dieterich Buxtehude (BuxWV 180) and Johann Pachelbel.  

The last verse of the hymn is the closing chorale of cantata . The melody was also used as the cantus firmus of two chorale preludes for organ in his Clavier-Übung III: BWV 684, a four-part setting for two manuals and pedal; and BWV 685 for single manual.

References

Further reading 
 Kurt Aland (ed.): Luther Deutsch, Band 6, Stuttgart/Göttingen 2.1966, S. 352f

External links 

 Ein Geistlich Lied von unser heiligen Tauffe, darin fein kurtz gefasset, was sie sey? Wer sie gestifftet habe? Was sie nütze? etc. text in zeno.org
 BWV 7.7 bach-chorales.com

16th-century hymns in German
16th-century Christian texts
Hymn tunes
Hymns by Martin Luther
1543 works